Fore Street is a restaurant in the Old Port neighborhood of Portland, Maine, United States. It is located a block from Commercial Street and Portland's waterfront. Opened in 1996, the restaurant was named one of Gourmet magazine's top 50 restaurants in the United States in 2002, being placed 16th on the list. Chef Sam Hayward was named the top chef in the Northeastern US in 2004 by the James Beard Foundation. In 2002, The Atlantic magazine named Fore Street a "restaurant to build a trip around." In February 2011, Fore Street was nominated by the Beard Foundation for the award of 'Most Outstanding Restaurant'.

References

External links
 Official website
 Fore Street Boston Magazine

Restaurants established in 1996
Restaurants in Portland, Maine
1996 establishments in Maine